Jovette Marchessault (February 9, 1938 – December 31, 2012) was a Canadian writer and artist from Quebec, who worked in a variety of literary and artistic domains including novels, poetry, drama, painting and sculpture. An important pioneer of lesbian and feminist literature and art in Canada, many of her most noted works were inspired by other real-life women in literature and art, including Violette Leduc, Gertrude Stein and Alice B. Toklas, Emily Carr, Anaïs Nin and Helena Blavatsky.

Career
Born in Montreal, Marchessault worked in a textile factory in her youth before travelling extensively in the late 1950s on a journey of self-discovery that would inform much of her work. By 1970, she was regularly exhibiting artwork in Montreal, Toronto, New York City, Paris and Brussels. She published her first novel, Le Crachat solaire, in 1975; this would be the first volume in her Comme une enfant de la terre trilogy, which also included the novels La Mère des herbes (1981) and Des Cailloux blancs pour les forêts obscures (1987). As a playwright, she published numerous plays; her early works Les Vaches de nuit, Les Faiseuses d'anges and Chronique lesbienne du moyen-âge québécois were also republished in 1980 in one volume as Triptyque lesbien.

Marchessault contributed as a journalist to publications such as Le Devoir, Châtelaine, La Vie en rose, La Nouvelle barre du jour, Fireweed and 13 Moon. She co-founded the publishing house Squawtach Press, and was a lecturer in the theater department at the Université du Québec à Montréal.

Awards and honors
Marchessault's play La Terre est trop courte, Violette Leduc was a nominee for French-language Drama at the 1982 Governor General's Awards, and her play Le Voyage magnifique d'Emily Carr won the award at the 1990 Governor General's Awards.

She was inducted into the Conseil des arts et des lettres du Québec in 1993. A portrait of Marchessault, by artist Robert Laliberté, is held by The ArQuives: Canada's LGBTQ2+ Archives' National Portrait Collection, in honor of her role as a builder of LGBT culture and history in Canada.

Works

Novels (The Comme une enfant de la terre trilogy)

References

1938 births
2012 deaths
20th-century Canadian novelists
20th-century Canadian poets
21st-century Canadian novelists
21st-century Canadian poets
Canadian women poets
Canadian women dramatists and playwrights
20th-century Canadian painters
21st-century Canadian painters
Canadian women sculptors
Canadian women painters
Canadian women novelists
Canadian lesbian writers
Artists from Montreal
Writers from Montreal
Canadian poets in French
French Quebecers
Academic staff of the Université du Québec à Montréal
Canadian feminist writers
Governor General's Award-winning dramatists
Canadian LGBT dramatists and playwrights
Canadian LGBT poets
Canadian LGBT novelists
20th-century Canadian dramatists and playwrights
21st-century Canadian dramatists and playwrights
20th-century Canadian women writers
21st-century Canadian women writers
Canadian novelists in French
Canadian dramatists and playwrights in French
20th-century Canadian sculptors
21st-century Canadian sculptors
20th-century Canadian women artists
21st-century Canadian women artists
Lesbian dramatists and playwrights
Lesbian novelists
21st-century Canadian LGBT people
20th-century Canadian LGBT people
Canadian lesbian artists